The 1956–57 Challenge Cup was the 56th staging of rugby league's oldest knockout competition, the Challenge Cup.

First round

Second round

Quarterfinals

Semifinals

Final

Leeds beat Barrow 9-7 in the Challenge Cup Final played at Wembley Stadium before a crowd of 76,318.

This was Leeds’ eighth Challenge Cup final win in ten Final appearances. Jeff Stevenson, their scrum half back, was awarded the Lance Todd Trophy for his man-of-the-match performance.

References

Challenge Cup
Challenge Cup